Vodafone Iceland is an Icelandic telecommunications company owned by Sýn. Although the company carries the Vodafone brand and trademark, Vodafone Group owns no interest in the company, but rather franchises the brand and associated advertising styles.

Vodafone Iceland offers mobile (2G/3G/4G), fixed-line services as well as ADSL, VDSL and fiber Internet services to individuals and companies. It also provides a managed multicast IPTV and pay television services over digital terrestrial television, DVB-T2. Its telecommunications branch is a franchise of the Vodafone network, formerly known as Og Vodafone and from 5 October 2006 as Vodafone Iceland. Vodafone Iceland is the first partner network to hold the Vodafone brand. The company is registered in Iceland under the name Fjarskipti hf.

Vodafone Iceland previously ran Digital Iceland, the MMDS broadcasting system for 365 corporation, from the 22 November 2006, until it was closed in 2017. 

In 2014, the Icelandic public broadcaster RÚV, signed an agreement with Vodafone Iceland to run a shared system of DVB-T/T2 multiplexes to serve all of Iceland, facilitating the digital switchover. Vodafone Iceland operates the digital transmission system by contract to 2028 and all RÚV channels are free-to-air, while customers can buy a pay-tv package to access commercial channels by use of a CI Access Module, however it's IPTV service is more popular. 

The main competitor of Vodafone Iceland is Síminn.

Vodafone Iceland also operates an Internet Exchange Point in cooperation with Síminn, called Múli-IXP.

See also 
Síminn
Nova
Internet in Iceland
Telecommunications in Iceland

References

External links

Vodafone
Telecommunications companies of Iceland
Telecommunications companies established in 2003
Internet service providers of Iceland
Companies based in Reykjavík
2003 establishments in Iceland